Immersion therapy is a psychological technique which allows a patient to overcome fears (phobias), but can be used for anxiety and panic disorders.

First a fear-hierarchy is created: the patient is asked a series of questions to determine the level of discomfort the fear causes in various conditions. Can the patient talk about the object of their fear, can the patient tolerate a picture of it or watch a movie which has the object of their fear, can they be in the same room with the object of their fear, and/or can they be in physical contact with it?

Once these questions have been ordered beginning with least discomfort to most discomfort, the patient is taught a relaxation exercise. Such an exercise might be tensing all the muscles in the patient's body then relaxing them and saying "relax", and then repeating this process until the patient is calm.

Next, the patient is exposed to the object of their fear in a condition with which they are most comfortable - such as merely talking about the object of their fear.  Then, while in such an environment, the patient performs the relaxation exercise until they are comfortable at that level.

After that, the patient moves up the hierarchy to the next condition, such as a picture or movie of the object of fear, and then to the next level in the hierarchy and so on until the patient is able to cope with the fear directly.

Although it may take several sessions to achieve a resolution, the technique is regarded as successful. Many research studies are being conducted in regard to achieving immersion therapy goals in a virtual computer based program, although results are not conclusive.

See also
Flooding (psychology)

References 

Behavior therapy
Anxiety disorder treatment